Jacques Stern (born 21 August 1949) is a cryptographer, currently a professor at the École Normale Supérieure. He received the 2006 CNRS Gold medal. His notable work includes the cryptanalysis of numerous encryption and signature schemes, the design of the Pointcheval–Stern signature algorithm, the Naccache–Stern cryptosystem and Naccache–Stern knapsack cryptosystem, and the block ciphers CS-Cipher, DFC, and xmx. He also contributed to the cryptanalysis of the SFLASH signature scheme.

Awards 
 Knight of the Légion d'honneur recipient
 2005 CNRS Silver Medal
 IACR Fellow, 2005
 2006 CNRS Gold medal
 2007 RSA Award for Excellence in Mathematics

References

External links

Modern cryptographers
Public-key cryptographers
Living people
1949 births
French cryptographers
International Association for Cryptologic Research fellows